Yazula (Ĵazulu) is a rural locality (a selo) in Ulagansky District, the Altai Republic, Russia. The population was 247 as of 2016. There are 4 streets.

The villagers of Yazula allegedly exhibit extraordinary sight, which they claim comes as a gift from a creature called Almasti. Scientists considered it either a positive mutation caused by isolation in the mountains, or effect of radiation from falling Baikonur Cosmodrome space junk, which also allegedly once killed a cow. Some Yazulan villagers also used Baikonur wrecks to create outhouses. However, very little information about this phenomenon is documented.

Geography 
Yazula is located 87 km east of Ulagan (the district's administrative centre) by road. Saratan is the nearest rural locality.

References 

Rural localities in Ulagansky District